CBCT may refer to:

 CBCT-DT, a television station (channel 13) licensed to Charlottetown, Prince Edward Island, Canada
 CBCT-FM, a radio station (96.1 FM) licensed to Charlottetown, Prince Edward Island, Canada
 Helical cone beam computed tomography
 Cone beam computed tomography